Melchior Aymerich (1754 in Ceuta – 1836 in Cuba) was a Spanish general and provincial administrator, serving as the last president of the Royal Audience of Quito from April until May 1822. One of the last Spanish colonial provinces to be overthrown during the final years of the Spanish American wars of independence, he was defeated by rebel General Antonio José de Sucre at the Battle of Pichincha on May 24, 1822, formally surrendering two days later.

References
Dupuy, Trevor N. The Harper Encyclopedia of Military Biography. New York: HarperCollins Publishers Inc., 1992. 

1754 births
1836 deaths
Spanish generals
History of Ecuador
People of the Spanish American wars of independence